Haverhill station is an intercity and regional rail station located in downtown Haverhill, Massachusetts, United States. It is served by Amtrak's Downeaster service and the MBTA Commuter Rail Haverhill/Reading Line; it is the northern terminus of MBTA service.

History

A bridge across the river was built in 1839, with service extended to East Kingston, New Hampshire via Haverhill on January 1, 1840. The railroad was renamed as the Boston and Maine Railroad (B&M) in 1843. The original station, with colonnades on several sides, was soon supplemented with a brick freight house. Haverhill had service suitable for commuting to Boston almost immediately; even after  became the outer limit for some commuter service in the 1850s, Haverhill remained the terminus of some trains.

A new brick station with a four-sided clock tower, design by local architect Josiah Littlefield, was built in 1867 on the east side of the tracks. A larger wooden freight house replaced the brick freight house several years later. 

In the 1890s, the city began pushing for the elimination of grade crossings, including busy Washington Street adjacent to the station. A 1904–06 project eliminated crossings at Washington, Essex, Winter, and Elm streets by raising the railroad through Bradford and Haverhill. Although the city requested new station buildings on both sides of the tracks, the B&M instead added another story to the existing station and removed the clock tower. A pedestrian tunnel led to a waiting room on the west side of the tracks. The B&M used a temporary station at Essex Street while construction was in progress. The final cost of the project was $750,000. The existing freight house was not raised, while the former brick freight house was cut in half and moved away from the tracks for reuse. All three structures are still extant, though the newer freight house was partially destroyed by a fire.

On January 3, 1965, the B&M discontinued all intercity service on the mainline; a single commuter round trip to Dover was retained. On June 30, 1967, that trip was curtailed to Haverhill; Haverhill and several towns to the south paid to retain the single trip. North Andover stopped funding in 1974 and Andover in 1976; Haverhill withdrew support and the trip was discontinued in June 1976. The Massachusetts Bay Transportation Authority (MBTA) bought all B&M commuter equipment and lines on December 27, 1976, including the Western Route from Wilmington Junction to the New Hampshire border. After a three-year period with no rail service, the station reopened on December 17, 1979 when the MBTA funded a return of several daily round trips. 

The other stations on the northern section of the Haverhill Line were modified for accessibility in the early 1990s; however, MBTA and town officials could not agree on the details of the Haverhill reconstruction. The MBTA opened bidding on the Haverhill station project - which included accessible mini-high platforms and a 160-space parking lot - in June 1998. The $4 million project was projected to take 18 months. The Downeaster began service, with a stop at the newly renovated Haverhill station, on December 14, 2001.

Bus connections
Haverhill is one of two major hubs for MVRTA fixed-route local bus service. Nine routes run from the Washington Square Transit Center three blocks to the east:
1: Lawrence-Methuen-Haverhill
13: Main Street/North Avenue
14: Bradford/Ward Hill
15: Hilldale Avenue/Haverhill Commons
16: Washington Street/Westgate Plaza
18: Riverside
51: Haverhill-Amesbury
83: Salisbury Beach/Hampton Beach

References

External links

Haverhill – MBTA
Haverhill, MA – USA Rail Guide (TrainWeb)

Amtrak stations in Massachusetts
MBTA Commuter Rail stations in Essex County, Massachusetts
Stations along Boston and Maine Railroad lines
Buildings and structures in Haverhill, Massachusetts
Railway stations in the United States opened in 1979